5-over-1, also known as a one-plus-five, or a podium building, is a type of multi-family residential building commonly found in urban areas of North America. The mid-rise buildings are normally constructed with four or five wood-frame stories above a concrete podium (usually for retail or resident amenity space). The name derives from the maximum permissible five floors of combustible construction (Type III or Type V) over a fire-resistive Type I podium of one floor for "5-over-1" or two floors for "5-over-2", as defined in the United States-based International Building Code (IBC) Section 510.2. Some sources instead attribute the name to the wood framing of the upper construction; the International Building Code uses "Type V" to refer to non-fireproof structures, including those framed with dimensional lumber. 

The style of buildings originated with the work of architect Tim Smith in Los Angeles, who took advantage of a change in construction code allowing the use of fire-retardant treated wood (FRTW) to construct buildings up to five stories. From this he saw that what became the "Five-Over-One" model would bring the construction costs down substantially, making a 100-unit affordable housing project financially viable.

The style took root in New York and other dense cities in the American Northeast following the revisions in the 2000 IBC edition, and it exploded in popularity in the 2010s, following a 2009 revision to IBC, which allowed up to five stories of wood-framed construction.

Description

The first recorded example of 5-over-1 construction is an affordable housing apartment building in Los Angeles built in 1996. The wood-framed 5-over-1 style is popular due to its high density and relatively lower construction costs compared to steel and concrete. 5-over-1 buildings often feature secure-access interior hallways with residential units on both sides, which favors a U, E, C, or right-angle building shape. The exteriors of 5-over-1 buildings often contain flat windows, rainscreen cladding, and Hardie board cement fiber panels.

These buildings are also sometimes called a Wrap or Texas Doughnut, which describes a multifamily building which is wrapped around a parking garage in the center. This style is common in areas with higher minimum parking requirements.

Criticism
The 5-over-1 style of buildings are often criticized for their high fire risk when under construction, as well as their blandness. Some cities and jurisdictions have considered additional regulations for multi-story wood-framed structures. After an under construction apartment complex burned to the ground in downtown Waltham, Massachusetts, the city council voted 14-0 to request that the state reevaluate the building code for 5-over-1 buildings. The borough of Edgewater, New Jersey, introduced a resolution calling on the state of New Jersey to enact stricter fire safety regulations for wood-framed buildings following a large fire that occurred in the wood-framed Avalon at Edgewater apartments in 2015.

The 5-over-1 style of apartment buildings are also often negatively associated with gentrification, due to the popularity of the building style in neighborhoods affected by development-induced displacement. However, the construction of new high-density housing such as 5-over-1-style apartments have been shown to have a positive effect on slowing rising housing costs and displacement.

See also
Mixed-use development
Three-decker (house)

References

Apartment types
House types
Housing in the United States
Urban design
Urban planning
2010s architecture in the United States